Southworth House is a historic home located at Dryden in Tompkins County, New York. It was built in 1836 and is a two-story Federal style brick residence.

It was listed on the National Register of Historic Places in 1984.

References

Houses on the National Register of Historic Places in New York (state)
Federal architecture in New York (state)
Houses completed in 1836
Houses in Tompkins County, New York
National Register of Historic Places in Tompkins County, New York